The Shadow Cabinet of Kyriakos Mitsotakis was announced on 21 January 2016, ten days after the election of Kyriakos Mitsotakis as President of New Democracy. As Leader of the Opposition, Mitsotakis could appoint a shadow cabinet to assist him in his duties.

Many members of the shadow cabinet were appointed ministers in Mitsotakis' government in July 2019.

Composition

Each of the main six coordinators were responsible for specific areas of policy covered by Standing Committee Groups (EFC). Each coordinator had a number of other shadow cabinet members that cover more specific policy areas. Also, Vasilis Kikilias served as a special migration coordinator, an area not covered by the EFCs.

 Leader of the Opposition - Kyriakos Mitsotakis
 Defence and Foreign Affairs Coordinator - Dora Bakoyannis
 Defence - Thanasis Davakis
 Foreign Affairs - Ioannis A. Kefalogiannis
 European Affairs - Stavros Kalafatis 
 Hellenes Abroad - Anastasios Dimoschakis
 Economic Affairs Coordinator - Christos Staikouras
 Financial Policy - Christos Dimas 
 Taxation Policy - Apostle Vesyropoulos 
 Tourism - Fotini Arabatzi
 Public Order, Public Administration and Justice Coordinator - Makis Voridis
 Interior - Charalambos Athanasiou
 Administrative Reform and e-Governance - George Georgantas 
 Public Order and Citizen Protection - Dimitris Kyriazidis
 Justice, Transparency and Human Rights - Constantine Tzavaras 
 Production and Trade Coordinator - Olga Kefalogianni
 Sector Development and Competitiveness - Anna-Michelle Asimakopoulou 
 Area Infrastructure, Transport and Networks - Kostas Karamanlis
 Marine and the Aegean - Simos Kedikoglou 
 Agriculture - George Kasapidis
 Energy Sector, Environment and Climate Change - Kostas Skrekas 
 Social Affairs Coordinator - Nikolaos Panagiotopoulos
 Macedonia and Thrace - Theodoros Karaoglou 
 Social Security and Welfare - Vasilis Oikonomou
 Healthcare - Christos Kellas
 Social Solidarity - Sofia Voultepsi 
 Cultural Affairs Coordinator - Theodoros Fortsakis
 Culture - Kostas Gioulekas
 Education - Maximos Charakopoulos 
 Research and Innovation - Maria Antoniou
 Sports - Anna Karamanli
 Special Migration Coordinator - Vasilis Kikilias

Sources:

References

Greek shadow cabinets
New Democracy (Greece)
2016 in Greek politics